Karchevskaya is a rural locality (a village) in Ilezskoye Rural Settlement, Tarnogsky District, Vologda Oblast, Russia. The population was 20 as of 2002.

Geography 
Karchevskaya is located 38 km northeast of Tarnogsky Gorodok (the district's administrative centre) by road. Yakinskaya is the nearest rural locality.

References 

Rural localities in Tarnogsky District